Yablonovo is a rural locality (a selo) in Valuysky District, Belgorod Oblast, Russia. The population was 421 as of 2010. There are 7 streets.

Geography 
Yablonovo is located 12 km west of Valuyki (the district's administrative centre) by road. Agoshevka is the nearest rural locality.

References 

Rural localities in Valuysky District